Banksia brunnea  is a species of low, bushy shrub that is endemic to the south-west of Western Australia. It has dark green pinnatisect leaves, heads of up to seventy pink and brownish flowers and glabrous follicles in the fruiting head.

Description
Banksia brunnea is a bushy, much-branched shrub that typically grows to a height of  but does not form a lignotuber.

Taxonomy and naming
This banksia was first formally described in 1845 by Carl Meissner who gave it the name Dryandra brownii and published the description in Lehmann's Plantae Preissianae. In 2007 Austin Mast and Kevin Thiele transferred all the dryandras to the genus Banksia but as there was already a plant named Banksia brownii, Mast and Thiele chose the specific epithet "brunnea". The specific epithet is from a Latin word meaning "brown".

Distribution and habitat
Banksia brunnea grows in kwongan between Albany, the Stirling Range and the Fitzgerald River National Park.

Conservation status
This species is classified as "not threatened" by the Western Australian Government Department of Parks and Wildlife.

Ecology
An assessment of the potential impact of climate change on this species found that its range is likely to contract by between 30% and 80% by 2080, depending on the severity of the change.

References

brunnea
Endemic flora of Western Australia
Eudicots of Western Australia
Plants described in 1845
Taxa named by Kevin Thiele